Nesara is a genus of moths in the family Lasiocampidae. The genus was erected by Francis Walker in 1855.

List of species
 Nesara apicalis Walker, 1855
 Nesara lasthenia (Druce, 1887)
 Nesara lauda (Druce, 1887)
 Nesara plagiata (Walker, 1855)

References

Lasiocampidae